Dimmick is a surname. Notable people with the surname include:

Alan Dimmick (born 1961), Scottish photographer
Carolyn R. Dimmick (born 1929), United States federal judge
Glenn Dimmick (born 1905), American electrical engineer
Mary Dimmick Harrison (1858–1948), second wife of the 23rd U.S. president Benjamin Harrison
Milo Melankthon Dimmick (1811–1872), Democratic member of the U.S. House of Representatives from Pennsylvania
William Harrison Dimmick (1815–1861), Democratic member of the U.S. House of Representatives from Pennsylvania

See also
Dimmick Township, LaSalle County, Illinois